HD 200661 (HR 8067) is a solitary star in the equatorial constellation Equuleus. It has an apparent magnitude of 6.41, placing it near the max naked eye visibility.

HD 200661 has a stellar classification of K0 III, indicating that the object is an early K-type giant star that is on the horizontal branch. At present HD 200661 has 1.74 times the Sun’s mass, and shines at 51.3 times the luminosity of the Sun from its enlarged photosphere at an effective temperature of 4,740 K, giving it a yellow-orange glow.

References 

200661
8067
K-type giants
Equulei, 7
104041
Durchmusterung objects
Equuleus